The Come-See-Me festival is an annual Spring festival hosted in Rock Hill, South Carolina.

About the Festival

Awarded the SC Event of the Year, the Come-See-Me Festival offers more than 70 events and activities throughout Rock Hill. It is considered the largest, all-volunteer festival in South Carolina and attracted more than 122,000 participants in 2016. Guests represented 22 states and four countries (Canada, France, Germany and Vietnam). The festival has been ranked in the South's Top 20 Spring Festivals multiple years. Official sponsors of the 2015 Come-See-Me Festival are Carolinas Healthcare System, The City of Rock Hill, Comporium, Rock Hill Coca-Cola Bottling Company, and Williams & Fudge, Inc.

Come-See-Me debuted spring of 1962 as a community project to encourage tourists, relatives and friends to visit Rock Hill during its most beautiful season. Begun as a weekend event, its popularity grew and allowed the festival to expand to its current length of 10 fun-filled days.

The brain-child of C.H. “Icky” Albright, former Rock Hill Mayor and State Senator, Come-See-Me also was nurtured by another Rock Hill resident, the late Vernon Grant, nationally acclaimed illustrator and creator of Kellogg's® celebrated gnomes, “Snap, Crackle and Pop®.” Grant created the Festival's mascot, “Glen the Frog”®, of which Grant designed more than 30 different styles. Each year the festival chair selects a new logo and updates its design and colors.

A central focus of the Festival has always been the historic, award-winning Glencairn Garden, created by Dr. David A. Bigger and given to the City of Rock Hill in 1958. Camellias, dogwoods, wisteria and a variety of flowers and trees surround more than 3,500 azaleas with a cascading lily pond (with live frogs!)

This festival went on hiatus in 2020.

Highlight activities
Parade
Road Races - 10K, 5K and Fun Run
Musical Mania
Chalk on Main
Beach Bash
Glencairn Garden concerts
Mayor's Frog Jump
Gourmet Gardens
Hops at the Park
Sundaes with Glen and Mother Goose
Moonlight Jazz & Blues
Tailgate Party

Organizers
The festival is hosted by the Festival Chair and a committee of team leaders. A Board Of Governors oversees the business aspects of the Festival.

In popular culture

Books
UFOs Over Reston (2014), Mentions Rock Hill's "Come See Me Festival" and Glen the Frog.

References
 http://www.cityofrockhill.com

External links
https://www.comeseeme.org/

Festivals in South Carolina
Festivals established in 1962
Tourist attractions in York County, South Carolina
1962 establishments in South Carolina